WRTH may refer to:

 WRTH (FM), a radio station (103.3 FM), licensed to serve Greer, South Carolina, United States
 KZQZ, a radio station (1430 AM), licensed to serve St. Louis, Missouri, United States, which held the call sign WRTH from 1991 to 2005
 KFNS (AM), a radio station (560 AM), licensed to serve Wood River, Illinois, United States, which held the call sign WRTH from 1965 to 1988.
 World Radio TV Handbook